The Royal Assent Act 1967 (c. 23) is an Act of the Parliament of the United Kingdom that amends the law relating to the signification of royal assent to allow laws from the Parliament of the United Kingdom to be enacted though the pronunciation and notification of both Houses of Parliament, and repeals the Royal Assent by Commission Act 1541. It received royal assent on 10 May 1967.

The Act does not apply to the royal assent of any legislation that is and has been passed by the Scottish Parliament, Welsh Parliament or the Northern Ireland Assembly (nor its predecessor the Northern Ireland Parliament which did exist at the time the Act was passed) since the establishment of devolution.

Nothing in the Royal Assent Act 1967 affects the power of the monarch to signify their royal assent in person in the House of Lords. Queen Victoria was the last Sovereign to do so in 1854.

References

External links

United Kingdom Acts of Parliament 1967